This is a list of notable British Muslims.

Academia and education

 Haroon Ahmed  Emeritus Professor of Microelectronics at the Cavendish Laboratory, the Physics Department of the University of Cambridge
 Sara Ahmed – Professor of Race and Cultural Studies at Goldsmiths and academic working at the intersection of feminist theory, queer theory, critical race theory and postcolonialism
 Shabbir Akhtar  Honorary Research Fellow, Faculty of Theology and Religions at University of Oxford
 Ash Amin  Head of Geography at Cambridge University
 Ali Ansari university professor at the University of St Andrews
 Khizar Humayun Ansari – academic who was awarded an OBE in 2002 for his work in the field of race and ethnic relations.
 Sarah Ansari – professor of history at Royal Holloway, University of London
 Akil N. Awan - British academic and the current RCUK Fellow at the Royal Holloway, University of London
 Tipu Zahed Aziz  professor of neurosurgery at the John Radcliffe Hospital in Oxford; lecturer at Magdalen College, Oxford and Imperial College London medical school
 Reza Banakar – professor of socio-legal studies at the University of Westminster, London
 Quassim Cassam – Professor of Philosophy at the University of Warwick
 Abbas Edalat university professor at Imperial College London
 Mohammed Ghanbari professor at the University of Essex
 Joel Hayward – New Zealand-born British scholar and writer
 Delwar Hussain – writer, anthropologist and correspondent for The Guardian. In 2013, his first book Boundaries Undermined: The Ruins of Progress on the Bangladesh-India Border was published.
 Dilwar Hussain  research fellow at The Islamic Foundation in Leicester; co-authored the 2004 book British Muslims Between Assimilation and Segregation; is on the Home Office's committee tackling radicalisation and extremism
Musharraf Hussain – scientist, educator and religious scholar, the Chief executive of the Karimia Institute Nottingham. Awarded an OBE by Her Majesty the Queen in 2008 for his services to community relations.
 Saiful Islam – Professor of Materials Chemistry at the University of Bath and a recipient of the Royal Society Wolfson Research Merit award.
 Naila Kabeer – Social economist, research fellow and writer. She works primarily on poverty, gender and social policy issues. Her research interests include gender, poverty, social exclusion, labour markets and livelihoods, social protection, focussed on South and South East Asia.
 Amir Kassam – visiting professor in the School of Agriculture, Policy and Development at the University of Reading
 Syma Khalid - biophysicist who is a Professor of Computational Biophysics in Chemistry at the University of Southampton.
 Mushtaq Khan – Heterodox economist and Professor of Economics at the School of Oriental and African Studies. His work focuses on the economics of poor countries, including contributions to the field of institutional economics and South Asian development.
 Yasmin Khan – historian of British India and Associate Professor of History at The University of Oxford
 Ehsan Masood  science writer, journalist and broadcaster; editor of Research Fortnight and Research Europe; teaches International Science Policy at Imperial College London
 Muhammad Haroon (Alfred Neville May)
 Azra Meadows OBE  honorary lecturer in the Institute of Biomedical and Life Sciences at The University of Glasgow
 Ali Mobasheri associate professor and reader at University of Surrey
 Tariq Modood  Professor of Sociology, Politics and Public Policy at the University of Bristol
 Kalbe Razi Naqvi – British Pakistani physicist, who has been ordinarily resident in Norway since 1977, working as a professor of biophysics in the Norwegian University of Science and Technology
 Mohammad Hashem Pesaranacademic, economist, professor of economics at Cambridge University, fellow of Trinity College, Cambridge
 Nazneen Rahman – geneticist who specialises in cancer and heads up the Cancer Genetics Clinical Unit at the Royal Marsden. Her research has seen success in identifying genes that cause cancer particularly in women and children.
 Ziauddin Sardar – scholar, writer and cultural critic
 Ghulam Sarwar  Director of the Muslim Educational Trust; writer on Islam in English, wrote the first English textbook, Islam: Beliefs and Teachings, for madrasah students in Britain, which is used worldwide in religious education classes, especially in British schools
 Salman SayyidProfessor of Social Theory and Decolonial Thought at the University of Leeds
 Ghayasuddin Siddiqui  academic and political activist
 Jawed Siddiqi  professor emeritus of software engineering at Sheffield Hallam University and political activist
 Mona Siddiqui – University of Edinburgh Professor of Islamic Studies a Public Understanding; regular contributor to BBC Radio 4, The Times, Scotsman, The Guardian, and The Herald 
 Azim Surani – developmental biologist who has been Marshall–Walton Professor at the Wellcome Trust/Cancer Research UK Gurdon Institute at the University of Cambridge since 1992, and Director of Germline and Epigenomics Research since 2013.
 Saeed Vaseghi professor at Brunel University

Business and finance
 Abdul Latif  restaurateur known for his dish "Curry Hell". He died in 2008.
 Adam Kamani – CEO of Kamani Property Group and KM Capital as well as a co-founder of PrettyLittleThing.
 Afzal Kahn  Bradford-based entrepreneur; owns a specialist car design company; broke records in 2008 for paying £440,000 for a distinctive "F1" number plate; previously showed an interest in purchasing Newcastle football club
 Ali Parsa  former chief executive officer of private healthcare partnership Circle
 Alireza Sagharchi principal at Stanhope Gate Architecture
 Amar Latif - Scottish entrepreneur, television personality and professional traveller
 Aneel Mussarat – property millionaire; his company, MCR Property Group, rents apartments to university students in Manchester and Liverpool
 Sir Anwar Pervez – Pakistan-born billionaire businessman; 6th richest Asian in Great Britain and the richest Muslim; founder of the Bestway Group 
 Asim Siddiqui – chairman and a founding trustee of The City Circle
 Atique Choudhury – restaurateur; his restaurant Yum Yum won Best Thai Restaurant in London at the 2012 Asian Curry Awards
 Bajloor Rashid MBE – businessman and former president of the Bangladesh Caterers Association
 Enam Ali MBE – restaurateur; founder of the British Curry Awards and Spice Business Magazine
 Farad Azima industrialist, inventor and philanthropist
 Farhad Moshiri energy investor; part owner of Arsenal F.C.
 Farshid Moussavi founder of Foreign Office Architects
 Firoz Kassam – owned Oxford United F.C. from 1999 to 2006, and was named the 309th wealthiest person in the UK in the Sunday Times Rich List 2009 with an estimated fortune of £180 million.
 Gulam Noon, Baron Noon – founder of Noon products, manufacturing chilled and frozen ready meals
 Husna Ahmad – Bangladeshi-born British humanitarian; chief executive officer of the Faith Regen Foundation; sits on the Advisory Board to the East London Mosque; previously sat on the Department for Work and Pensions' Ethnic Minority Advisory Group
 Iqbal Ahmed OBE – entrepreneur, chairman and chief executive of Seamark Group'; made his fortune in shrimp; the highest British Bangladeshi to feature on the Sunday Times Rich List (placed at number 511 in 2006)
 Iqbal Wahhab OBE – entrepreneur, restaurateur, journalist, publisher; founder of Tandoori Magazine and multi-award-winning restaurant Cinnamon Club
 James Caan – businessman and entrepreneur; formerly a part of Dragons' Den
 Javed Ahmed – chief executive of Tate & Lyle plc, – a FTSE 250 company which is one of Britain's oldest brands; 
 Kaveh Alamouti  head of Global Macro Citadel LLC; chief executive officer of Citadel Asset Management Europe
 Mahmud Kamani – billionaire businessman, the co-founder of and joint CEO of Boohoo.com.
 Mahmoud Khayami, KSS industrialist; founder of Iran Khodro
 Mo Chaudry – born in Pakistan, he was raised in England and went on to become a millionaire businessman in the West Midlands
 Mohammad Ajman 'Tommy Miah' – internationally renowned celebrity chef, award-winning restaurateur, founder and promoter of the Indian Chef of the Year Competition
 Mohsin Issa – billionaire, businessman and founder of Euro Garages, a chain of petrol filling stations that operate in the United Kingdom and Europe.
 Moorad Choudhry – managing director, Head of Business Treasury, Global Banking & Markets at Royal Bank of Scotland plc
 Mumtaz Khan Akbar – founder and owner of the Mumtaz brand
 Muquim Ahmed – entrepreneur; became the first Bangladeshi millionaire at the age of 26, due to diversification in banking, travel, a chain of restaurants with the Cafe Naz group, publishing and property development
 Mustafa Suleyman – entrepreneur, activist and, most notably, the co-founder and Head of Applied AI at DeepMind, an artificial intelligence company acquired by Alphabet.
Naguib Kheraj – vice-chairman of Barclays Bank; former boss of JP Morgan Cazenove Chairman of the Aga Khan Foundation based in Karachi
 Nasser Golzari principal at Golzari (NG) Architects
 Leepu Nizamuddin Awlia – car engineer and coachbuilder who converts rusty old cars into imitation supercars in a workshop on Discovery Channel reality television programme Bangla Bangers/Chop Shop: London Garage
Mohammed Ibrahim Khan- Serial Entrepreneur and a Fintech evangelist
 Ragib Ali – industrialist, pioneer tea-planter, educationalist, philanthropist, and banker
 Ruzwana Bashir  British businesswoman, founder and CEO of Peek.com, travel company based in San Francisco, California
 Shelim Hussain MBE  entrepreneur, founder and managing director of Euro Foods (UK) Limited
 Siraj Ali  restaurateur and philanthropist; recipient of the 2011 British Bangladeshi Who's Who "Outstanding Contribution" Award
 Sultan Choudhury  businessman; managing director of the Islamic Bank of Britain
 Syed Ahmed  entrepreneur, businessman, and television personality; candidate on BBC reality television programme The Apprentice series two in 2006
 Tahir Mohsan  founder of Time Computers, Supanet, Tpad; manages several investment companies from his base in Dubai
 Tarak Ramzan – founder and CEO of the Quiz womenswear retail chain.
 Wali Tasar Uddin MBE  entrepreneur, restaurateur, community leader, and chairman of the Bangladesh-British Chamber of Commerce
 Waliur Rahman Bhuiyan OBE  managing director and Country Head of BOC Bangladesh Limited, one of the first British companies to invest in Bangladesh in the 1950s to produce and supply industrial and medical gases
 Zameer Choudrey  billionaire, Chief Executive of Bestway Group
 Zuber Issa – billionaire, businessman and founder of Euro Garages, a chain of petrol filling stations that operate in the United Kingdom and Europe.

Entertainment
 Aasif Mandvi – British-American actor and comedian
 Abdullah Afzal – actor and stand-up comedian
 Abid Khan - Director 
 Adil Ray  actor, writer and broadcaster. Creator of BBC One sitcom Citizen Khan.
 Adnan Sami  singer, musician, pianist, actor and composer
 Afshan Azad  actress best known for playing the role of Padma Patil in the Harry Potter film series
 Ahmad Hussain  singer-songwriter, executive, Record producer and founder and managing director of IQRA Promotions
 Ahsan Khan  film and television actor, host and performer
 Ahmed Salim  award-winning British producer, known for 1001 Inventions
 Akram Khan MBE  dancer and choreographer; named Outstanding Newcomer 2000, Best Modern Choreography 2002, and Outstanding Male or Female Artist (Modern) 2005 at the Critics' Circle National Dance Awards
 Alyy Khan  film and television actor and host
 Ali Shahalom  comedian who hosts the comedy YouTube channel Aliofficial1
 Annie Khalid – English-Pakistani musician and model
 Aqib Khan  actor; played Sajid Khan in the movie West is West
 Art Malik  Pakistani-born British actor who achieved fame in the 1980s through his starring and subsidiary roles in assorted British and Merchant-Ivory television serials and films
 Asif Kapadia – British filmmaker
 Ayub Khan-Din  actor and playwright
 Aziz Ibrahim  musician best known for his work as guitarist with Simply Red, The Stone Roses (post-John Squire)
 Babar Ahmed  British/American writer/director of Pashtun and Pakistani descent; according to the BBC 
 Babar Bhatti  actor; played Punkah Wallah Rumzan in the BBC sitcom It Ain't Half Hot Mum.
 Badi Uzzaman  television and film actor
 Boyan Uddin Chowdhury  former lead guitarist of rock band The Zutons
 Chunkz British YouTube personality, host, entertainer and former musician
 Dino Shafeek  actor and comedian who starred in several sitcoms during the 1970s and early 1980s; played Char Wallah Muhammed in It Ain't Half Hot Mum and Ali Nadim in Mind Your Language
 Guz Khan – comedian and actor
 Hannan Majid  documentary filmmaker whose films have been exhibited at international film festivals including Emirates, Cambridge, Durban, and Leeds
 Jamil Dehlavi – London-based independent film director and producer of Pakistani-French origin.
 Farook Shamsher  alternative dub/dance music DJ and record producer; received the Commitment to Scene award at the UK Asian Music Awards 2006
 Hadi Khorsandi comedian
 Hajaz Akram  British Pakistani actor
 Humza Arshad  actor and comedian; producer of the YouTube series Diary of a Badman
Ian Iqbal Rashid  poet, screenwriter and film director, known for the series This Life and Leaving Normal (TV series), and the feature films Touch of Pink and How She Move
 Idris Rahman  clarinettist 
 Jan Uddin  actor best known for his roles as Jalil Iqbal in BBC soap opera EastEnders and Sweet Boy in the film Shank
 Jay Shareef  award-winning stand-up comedian, broadcaster and journalist.
 Jeff Mirza  stand-up comedian and actor
 Kaniz Ali makeup artist and freelance beauty columnist; named Best Make-Up Artist at the 2011International Asian Fashion Awards
 Kayvan Novak actor; star of Fonejacker
 Kishon Khan  pianist and bandleader of Lokkhi Terra
 Lucy Rahman  singer
 Mani Liaqat  Manchester-based British Asian actor and comedian, known for his bizarre rants, portly figure, witty voice and mixture of Punjabi/Urdu/Hindi and British everyday-humour
 Munsur Ali  film producer, screenwriter and director; in 2014, he wrote, directed and produced Shongram, a romantic drama set during the 1971 Bangladesh Liberation War; first time a British film was simultaneously written, produced and directed by a British Bangladeshi
 Mazhar Munir – television and film actor; before co-starring in the 2005 movie Syriana, he appeared in three British television shows: The Bill, Mile High, and Doctors
 Menhaj Huda  film and television director, producer and screenwriter; directed and produced Kidulthood in 2006
 Mina Anwar  British actress; played Police Constable Maggie Habib in the sitcom The Thin Blue Line
 Mo Ali  Somali-British film director
 Muhammad Mumith Ahmed (Mumzy Stranger)  R&B and hip-hop singer, songwriter; first musician of Bangladeshi descent to release a single, "One More Dance"; namedBest Urban Act at the UK Asian Music Awards 2011
 Murtz  television and radio presenter
 Nabil Abdul Rashid  comedian of Nigerian descent
 Nadine Shah  singer, songwriter and musician
 Nadia Manzoor - writer, performer, and producer based in Brooklyn, New York.
 Natasha Khan  known by her stage name as "Bat for Lashes"; half Pakistani half English singer-songwriter and multi-instrumentalist
 Naz Ikramullah  British-Canadian artist and film producer of Pakistani origin
 Nazeel Azami  Nasheed singer-songwriter signed to Awakening Records
 Nazrin Choudhury  screenwriter; actress in drama serials; her critically acclaimed radio play "Mixed Blood" won the Richard Imison Award 2006
 Prince Abdi  Somali-born British stand-up comedian
 Rani Taj  dhol player dubbed as "Dhol Queen" after her YouTube video went viral
 Riz Ahmed  actor who played Omar in the movie Four Lions and Changez in The Reluctant Fundamentalist
 Rowshanara Moni  singer and actress
 Ruhul Amin  film director; has made 13 films for the BBC and Channel 4; most of his works are documentaries and experimental dramas
 Runa Islam  film and photography visual artist, nominated for the Turner Prize 2008
 Sadia Azmat  stand-up comedian
 Sanchita Islam  artist, writer and filmmaker; in 1999, she founded Pigment Explosion, which has branched out into projects including film, painting, drawing, writing and photography
 Sadik Ahmed  film director, cinematographer, and writer; wrote and directed international award-winning short film Tanju Miah, which was the first Bangladeshi film in the Toronto, Sundance, and Amsterdam film festivals in 2007
 Saifullah 'Sam' Zaman  DJ and producer associated with the Asian Underground movement, recording as "State of Bengal"
 Sakina Samo award-winning actress, producer and director
 Sami Yusuf musician
 Selma Chalabi – radio producer and journalist for BBC Wales.  She was born in the United Kingdom to an Iraqi father and English mother, and was raised in Winchester.
 Shabana Bakhsh  actress who has appeared in soaps such as River City and Doctors
 Shahid Khan – known as "Naughty Boy"; British-born Pakistani songwriter, record producer and musician
 Shahin Badar – singer and songwriter, best known for vocals on The Prodigy's single "Smack My Bitch Up", which earned her a Double Platinum award
 Shefali Chowdhuryactress best known for playing the role of Parvati Patil in the Harry Potter film series
 Shazia Mirza  comedian from Birmingham, England, whose act revolves around her Muslim faith
 Shehzad Afzal  writer, director, producer and game designer born in Dundee, Scotland 
 Sohini Alam, born 1978  singer for Lokkhi Terra and Khiyo bands. Born in London in 1978.
 Sophiya Haque  actress, singer and video jockey; played Poppy Morales in Coronation Street, 2008–2009.
 Suleman Mirza  lead dancer of Signature, runner-up on Britain's Got Talent 2008
 Suzana Ansar  singer, actress and television presenter based in the UK and Bangladesh; released her debut band album Suzana Ansar with Khansar in 2009
 Tan France – fashion designer, television personality, and author. He is currently the fashion expert for the Netflix series Queer Eye.
 Tez Ilyas – stand-up comedian of Pakistani descent
 Yusuf Islam
 Zahra Ahmadi actress
 

 Zain Javadd Malik, known mononymously as Zayn, is a British singer. Born and raised in Bradford, Malik auditioned as a solo contestant for the British music competition television series The X Factor in 2010.

Zain Javadd Malik — known mononymously as Zayn, is a British singer. Born and raised in Bradford, Malik auditioned as a solo contestant for the British music competition television series The X Factor in 2010.

Journalism and media
 Sheikh Abdul Qayum  chief imam of the East London Mosque; former lecturer at the international International Islamic University Malaysia; television presenter on Peace TV Bangla and Channel S
 A. N. M. Serajur Rahman  journalist, broadcaster, and Bangladeshi nationalist
 Aasmah Mir  BBC presenter and former columnist for the Sunday Herald
 Abdul Gaffar Choudhury  writer, journalist, and columnist for Bengali newspapers of Bangladesh; best known for his lyric "Amar Bhaier Rokte Rangano", which has become the main song commemorating the Language Movement
 Adil Ray  British radio and television presenter, for BBC Asian Network
 Adnan Nawaz  news and sports presenter for the BBC World Service
 Ajmal Masroor – television presenter, politician, imam, and UK Parliamentary candidate for Bethnal Green and Bow constituency representing Liberal Democrats in the 2010 general election; television presenter on political and Islamic programmes on Islam Channel and Channel S
 Ali Abbasi  former Scottish TV presenter
 Anila Baig columnist at The Sun
 Arif Ali  regional product director for the Associated Press news agency in Europe, Middle East and Africa
 Asad Ahmad  BBC journalist and news presenter
 Asad Qureshi  filmmaker who was kidnapped on 26 March 2010 by a militant group called the "Asian Tigers" in Pakistan's Federally Administered Tribal Areas
 Azad Ali  IT worker and civil servant for the HM Treasury; Islamic Forum of Europe spokesman; founding chair of the Muslim Safety Forum; vice-chair of Unite Against Fascism
 Azeem Rafiq  English cricketer
 Faisal Islam  economics editor and correspondent for Channel 4 News; named 2006 "Young Journalist of the Year" at the Royal Society of Television awards
 Fareena Alam  editor of British Muslim magazine Q News; named Media Professional of the Year by Islamic Relief in 2005 and at the Asian Women of Achievement Awards in 2006
 Faris Kermani film director based in the UK, now head of production company based in London, Crescent Films
 Hassan Ghani  Scottish broadcast journalist and documentary filmmaker, based in London
 Javed Malik  television anchor; publisher of the UAE's first diplomatic magazine, The International Diplomat; Executive Director of the World Forum; served as Pakistan's Ambassador at Large and Special Advisor to The Prime Minister; close friend of former Prime Minister Benazir Bhutto and Prime Minister Nawaz Sharif of Pakistan
 Kamran Abbasi  doctor, medical editor, and cricket writer; editor of the Journal of the Royal Society of Medicine; acting editor of the British Medical Journal; editor of the bulletin of the World Health Organization
 Kanak 'Konnie' Huq  television presenter, best known for being the longest-serving female Blue Peter presenter
 Lisa Aziz  news presenter and journalist, best known as the co-presenter of the Bristol-based ITV West Country nightly weekday news programme The West Country Tonight; one of the first Asian presenters to be seen on television; won the Ethnic Multicultural Media Academy Best Television News Journalist Award
 Maryam Moshiri BBC News presenter
 Mazher Mahmood (also known as the "Fake Sheikh")   often dubbed as "Britain's most notorious undercover reporter"; in a GQ survey was voted as the 45th most powerful man in Britain; the News of the World paid his six-figure salary, plus an editorial and technical support budget
 Mehdi Hasan  senior politics editor at the New Statesman and a former news and current affairs editor at Channel 4
 Miqdaad Versiassistant secretary general of the Muslim Council of Britain, media commentator, and advocate for accurate reporting on Muslims.
 Mishal Husain  anchor for BBC World
  Muhammad Abdul Bari Chairman of the East London Mosque; Secretary General of the Muslim Council of Britain, 2006–2010
 Nafeez Mosaddeq Ahmed  environment writer for The Guardian, t
 Nazenin Ansari  journalist, former correspondent for Voice of America's Persian News Network; Iranian analyst for BBC Radio 4, CNN International, Sky News and Aljazeera
 Nazia Mogra  television journalist for BBC North West Tonight news on BBC One
 Nima Nourizadeh film director
 Nina Hossain  journalist, newscaster, and sole presenter of ITV London's regional news programme London Tonight
 Nurul Islam  broadcast journalist, radio producer, and presenter best remembered for his work with the BBC World Service
 Osama Saeed  Head of International and Media Relations at the Al Jazeera Media Network
 Rageh Omaar  Somali-born British journalist and writer
 Reham Khan  journalist and anchor currently working at Dawn News
 Rizwan Khan  works for Al Jazeera English; has his own show called Riz Khan
 Sadeq Saba journalist, head of BBC Persian service
 Saima Mohsin  British journalist
 Saira Khan  runner-up on the first series of The Apprentice, and now a TV presenter on BBC's Temper Your Temper and Desi DNA
 Sarfraz Manzoor – British writer, journalist, documentary maker, and broadcaster; writes regularly for The Guardian; presents documentaries on BBC Radio 4
 Shaista Aziz  journalist, writer, stand-up comedian, and former international aid worker
 Shamim Chowdhury – television and print journalist for Al Jazeera English
 Shereen Nanjiani – radio journalist with BBC Radio Scotland
 Syed Neaz Ahmad – academic, writer, journalist, columnist and critic; best known for anchoring NTV Europe current affairs talk show Talking Point
 Tasmin Lucia-Khan – journalist, presenter and producer; delivered BBC Three's nightly hourly World News bulletins on in 60 Seconds; presented E24 on the rolling news channel BBC News; presents news on the ITV breakfast television programme Daybreak
 Tazeen Ahmad  British television and radio presenter and reporter
 Waheed Khan – documentary television director working in British television
 Yasmin Alibhai-Brown  journalist and author born in Uganda; regular columnist for The Independent and the Evening Standard
 Yvonne Ridley  journalist and Respect Party activist
 Zarqa Nawaz  freelance writer, journalist, broadcaster, and filmmaker

Law and justice

Judges
 Tan Ikram – appointed as a District Judge (Magistrates’ Courts) in 2003

 Akhlaq Choudhury – British High Court judge of England and Wales

Queen's Counsels
 Karim Asad Ahmad Khan QC – barrister at Temple Garden Chambers, London, chief prosecutor at the International Criminal Court
 Khawar Qureshi QC - barrister and international lawyer.

Other
 Aamer Anwar  Glaswegian solicitor; named as Criminal Lawyer of the Year by the Law Awards of Scotland in 2005 and 2006
 Amal Clooney  London-based Lebanese-British lawyer, activist, and author
 M. A. Muid Khan  barrister who was selected as the Best Human Rights Lawyer of England and Wales for 2012 by the Chartered Institute of Legal Executives; in September 2012, he was ranked as third in the top five Chartered Legal Executive Lawyers of England and Wales by the Law Society
 Mumtaz Hussain  solicitor and radio presenter; since 2010, she has presented Health and Healing with Mumtaz on RedShift Radio
 Nazir Afzal OBE – Chief Crown Prosecutor for North West England; one of his first decisions in that role was to initiate prosecutions in the case of the Rochdale sex trafficking gang

Literature and art
 Aamer Hussein –  short story writer and critic.
 Abdur Rouf Choudhury – Bengali diaspora writer and philosopher; numerous literary awards from Bangladesh including the Granthomela award and life membership from Bangla Academy
 Diriye Osman – Somali-British writer and visual artist
 Mohammed Mahbub "Ed" Husain – author of The Islamist, an account of his experience for five years with the Hizb ut-Tahrir
 Emran Mian – author and policy advisor at Whitehall
 Ghulam Murshid – author, scholar and journalist; numerous literary awards from India and Bangladesh, including the Bangla Academy award
 Idris Khan – artist based in London
 Imtiaz Dharker – poet and documentary filmmaker
 Kaniz Ali – makeup artist and freelance beauty columnist; won the "Best Make-Up Artist" category at the 2011 International Asian Fashion Awards
 Kia Abdullah – novelist and journalist; contributes to The Guardian newspaper and has written two novels
 Mohsin Hamid – Pakistani writer; novels Moth Smoke (2000), The Reluctant Fundamentalist (2007), and How to Get Filthy Rich in Rising Asia (2013)
 Monica Ali – author of Brick Lane, a novel based on a Bangladeshi woman
 Moniza Alvi – poet and writer
 Nadeem Aslam – novelist
 Nadifa Mohamed – Somali-British novelist
 Nafeez Mosaddeq Ahmed – author, lecturer, political scientist specialising in interdisciplinary security studies
 Nasser Azam – contemporary artist, living and working in London
 Omar Mansoor – London-based fashion designer, best known for his couture occasionwear
 Qaisra Shahraz – novelist, journalist, Fellow of the Royal Society of Arts and a director of Gatehouse Books
 Rasheed Araeen – London-based conceptual artist, sculptor, painter, writer, and curator
 Razia Iqbal – arts correspondent for the BBC; born in East Africa, of Muslim Punjabi origin
 Rekha Waheed – writer and novelist best known as the author of The A-Z Guide To Arranged Marriage
 Rezia Wahid MBE – award-winning textile artist whose work has been exhibited both in the UK and abroad
 Rizvan Rahman
 Roopa Farooki – novelist
 Ruby Hammer MBE – fashion and beauty makeup artist; founder of Ruby & Millie cosmetics bran
 Runa Islam – film and photography visual artist, nominated for the Turner Prize 2008
 Rupa Huq – senior lecturer in sociology at Kingston University, writer, columnist, Labour Party politician, music DJ and former Deputy Mayoress of the London Borough of Ealing
 S. F. Said – children's author
 Sanchita Islam – visual media artist
 Shahida Rahman – award-winning author of Lascar, writer and publisher
 Shamim Azad – bilingual poet, storyteller and writer
 Shamshad Khan – Manchester-based poet born in Leeds; editor of anthology of black women's poetry; advised the Arts Council of England North West on literature
 Shezad Dawood  artist based in London
 Suhayl Saadi  literary and erotic novelist and radio/stage playwright
 Tahir Rashid  British-born poet, manager and entrepreneur in the Islamic media and Nasheed industry
 Tahmima Anam  author of A Golden Age, the "Best First Book" winner of the 2008 Commonwealth Writers' Prize
 Vaseem Khan - writer, author of the Baby Ganesh Detective Agency novels
 Zarina Bhimji – Ugandan Asian photographer, based in London. She was nominated for the Turner Prize in 2007
 Ziauddin Sardar  scholar, writer and cultural critic

Military and police
 Ali Dizaei senior police officer.
 Jabron Hashmi  soldier who was killed in action in Sangin, Afghanistan on 1 July 2006
 Amjad Hussain – senior Royal Navy officer. He is the highest-ranking member of the British Armed Forces from an ethnic minority
 Muhammed Akbar Khan – served as a British recruit in the First World War and an officer in Second World War; first Muslim to become a general in the British Army
 Tarique Ghaffur – high-ranking British police officer in London's Metropolitan Police Service; Assistant Commissioner–Central Operations
 Mabs Hussain – Assistant chief constable for the Greater Manchester Police.

Policy

 Abul Fateh – diplomat and statesman; first Foreign Secretary of Bangladesh after independence in 1971
 Anwar Choudhury – British High Commissioner for Bangladesh, 2004–2008; first non-white British person to be appointed in a senior diplomatic post; Director of International Institutions at the Foreign & Commonwealth Office
 Asif Ahmad – British diplomat who served as the British Ambassador to Thailand from November 2010 until August 2012; since July 2013, he has been British Ambassador to the Philippines
Mockbul Ali OBE- British diplomat and the current British Ambassador to the Dominican Republic and the Republic of Haiti.
 Nahid Majid OBE – civil servant, chief operating officer of Regeneration Investment Organisation and Deputy Director within the Department for Work and Pensions the most senior British Bangladeshi Muslim woman in the civil service
 Saleemul Huq – scientist and Senior Fellow in the Climate Change Group at the International Institute for Environment and Development; recipient of the 2007 Burtoni Award for his work on climate change adaptation
 Talyn Rahman-Figueroa – director of diplomatic consultancy Grassroot Diplomat.

Politics

Members of Parliament
 Afzal Khan – Labour MP for Manchester Gorton solicitor and former Labour MEP for North West region; first Asian Lord Mayor of Manchester; currently Manchester City Council's Executive Member for Children's Services
 Anas Sarwar  Scottish Labour Party Leader and former Labour MP for Glasgow Central
 Anum Qaisar-Javed – Scottish National Party MP for Airdrie and Shotts
 Apsana Begum – Labour Party MP for Poplar and Limehouse since 2019
 Faisal Rashid – former Labour MP for Warrington South, elected in 2017. Mayor of Warrington in 2016.
 Feryal Clark – Labour Party politician who has served as the Member of Parliament for Enfield North since the 2019 United Kingdom general election
 Imran Ahmad Khan – Conservative Party Member of Parliament (MP) for Wakefield
 Imran Hussain  Labour MP for Bradford East
 Khalid Mahmood  Labour MP for Birmingham Perry Barr
 Mohammad Sarwar  former Labour MP for Glasgow Central; first British Muslim and Pakistani origin MP
 Mohammad Yasin – Labour MP for Bedford, elected in 2017.
 Naz Shah  Labour MP for the constituency of Bradford West
 Nus Ghani  Conservative MP for Wealden
 Rehman Chishti  Conservative MP for Gillingham and Rainham
 Rosena Allin-Khan  Labour MP for Tooting
 Rupa Huq – Labour MP for Ealing Central and Acton constituency
 Rushanara Ali  Labour MP for Bethnal Green and Bow Labour Party constituency; first person of Bangladeshi origin elected to the House of Commons; one of the first three Muslim women elected as a member of parliament
 Sadiq Khan  Mayor of London, former Labour MP for Tooting and former Shadow Secretary of State for Justice and Shadow Lord Chancellor
 Saqib Bhatti – Conservative MP for Meriden, first elected in the 2019 United Kingdom general election.
 Shahid Malik  former Labour MP for Dewsbury; Minister for International Development in Gordon Brown's government
 Shabana Mahmood  Labour MP For Birmingham Ladywood
 Tahir Ali – MP representing Birmingham Hall Green for the Labour Party.
 Tasmina Ahmed-Sheikh  former SNP MP for Ochil and South Perthshire
 Tulip Siddiq  Labour MP for Hampstead and Kilburn constituency
 Yasmin Qureshi  Labour MP for Bolton South East
 Zarah Sultana – Labour Party MP for Coventry South

Peers
 Aamer Sarfraz, Baron Sarfraz  former Conservative party treasurer
 Adam Hafejee, Lord Patel of Blackburn
 Amirali Alibhai, Lord Bhatia  life peer
  Arminka Helic, Baroness Helic  Bosnian-born British Special Adviser (SPAD) and Chief of Staff to the Former British Foreign Secretary William Hague
 Zameer Choudrey, Lord Choudrey CBE  Conservative life peer, businessman 
 Gulam Khaderbhoy, Lord Noon MBE  life peer, businessman and Chancellor of the University of East London
 Haleh, Baroness Afshar  Professor in Politics and Women's Studies at the University of York, England
 Khalid, Lord Hameed Chairman of Alpha Hospital Group; chairman and chief executive officer of the London International Hospital
 Kishwer Falkner, Baroness Falkner of Margravine  lead Liberal Democrat Spokesperson for Foreign Affairs in the House of Lords
 Meral, Baroness Hussein-Ece – Liberal Democrat life peeress
 Mohamed Iltaf, Lord Sheikh – Chairman of Conservative Muslim Forum
 Nazir, Lord Ahmed – Crossbench life peer, formerly Labour now retired.
 Nemat Shafik, Baroness Shafik – served as the director of the London School of Economics since September 2017.
 Nosheena Mobarik, Baroness Mobarik  Conservative Baroness of Mearns in the County of Renfrewshire; former Chairman of CBI Scotland
 Manzila Pola, Baroness Uddin – Labour Party life peer, community activist, and first Muslim and Asian to sit in the House of Lords
 Qurban, Lord Hussain – Liberal Democrat life peer
 Sayeeda Hussain, Baroness Warsi – lawyer and British politician for the Conservative Party and a former member of the Cabinet
Shaista Gohir, Baroness Gohir OBE - Crossbench life peer
 Shas Sheehan, Baroness Sheehan  Liberal Democrat and Baroness of Wimbledon in the London Borough of Merton and of Tooting in the London Borough of Wandsworth
 Syed Salah Kamall, Baron Kamall  Professor of Politics and International Relations at St Mary’s University, Twickenham and the Academic & Research Director at the Institute of Economic Affairs, a classical liberal think tank in London.
 Tariq Mahmood, Lord Ahmad of Wimbledon  life peer
 Waheed, Lord Alli  Labour life peer
 Wajid Khan, Baron Khan  Labour Baron of Burnley
 Zahida Manzoor, Baroness Manzoor  Liberal Democrat Baroness; former Legal Services Ombudsman; former Deputy Chair of the Commission for Racial Equality

Members of Scottish Parliament
 Anas Sarwar  Leader of the Scottish Labour party and Labour MSP for the Glasgow region
 Bashir Ahmad former SNP MSP
 Foysol Choudhury - Labour MSP for Lothian
 Hanzala Malik – Labour MSP for Glasgow
 Humza Yousaf – SNP Member of the Scottish Parliament for Glasgow and Minister for External Affairs and International Development
 Kaukab Stewart, SNP MSP for Glasgow Kelvin.

Members of the Senedd
 Altaf Hussain  former regional Assembly Member in the National Assembly for Wales from 2015 to 2016
 Mohammad Asghar  Welsh politician, representing the Welsh Conservative Party
 Natasha Asghar - Welsh politician, representing the Welsh Conservatives.  First female ethnic minority member elected to the Senedd

Members of the London Assembly
 Hina Bokhari - Liberal Democrat AM
 Marina Ahmad - Labour AM
 Murad Qureshi – Former Labour Greater London Assembly Member
 Sakina Sheikh - Labour AM

Mayors
 Chauhdry Abdul Rashid – former Lord Mayor of Birmingham
 Lutfur Rahman – Cllr, community activist, local Independent politician; became the first directly elected Mayor of Tower Hamlets in 2010; first Bangladeshi leader of the council 
 Mohammed Ajeeb – former Lord Mayor of Bradford; first Asian (Pakistani) Lord Mayor in the UK
 Rokhsana Fiaz – Labour Party politician serving as Mayor of Newham
 Sadiq Khan – elected Mayor of London in May 2016

Other
 Amjad Bashir  former Conservative MEP for Yorkshire and Humber; former UKIP Small & Medium Business spokesman
 Bashir Khanbhai  former Conservative MEP for East of England 
 Benyamin Habib – Brexit Party Member of the European Parliament (MEP) for London since 2019.
 Sajjad Karim former MEP  born in Brierfield, Lancashire; qualified as a solicitor before being elected as a Member of the European Parliament in 2007; Conservative Legal Affairs Spokesman; sits on the Industry, Research and Energy Committee
 Magid Magid – Green Party MEP for Yorkshire and the Humber.
 Shaffaq Mohammed – Liberal Democrats Member of the European Parliament (MEP) for the Yorkshire and the Humber since 2019.
 Mushtaq Ahmad – Lord Lieutenant of Lanarkshire. He was the first Asian to serve as Provost of a Scottish council
 Shahnaz Ali –  British Muslim woman known for her leadership role in equality, inclusion and human rights in the National Health Service and local government in England
 Bashir Maan – Pakistani-Scottish politician, businessman and writer
 Munira Mirza – was the Deputy Mayor for Education and Culture of London. Born in Oldham.
 Cllr Nasim Ali – Labour Party politician, councillor in Regent's Park, Cabinet Member for Young People in Camden Council and former Mayor of Camden; in May 2003, at age 34, he became the country's youngest mayor as well as the UK's first Bangladeshi and first Muslim mayor
 Rabina Khan, Cllr  Labour Party politician, councillor in Shadwell, cabinet member for housing in Tower Hamlets London Borough Council, community worker and author of Ayesha's Rainbow
 Salma Yaqoob former leader of the left-wing Respect Party and a Birmingham City Councillor
 Syeda Amina Khatun MBE  Labour Party councillor for Tipton Green in the Sandwell Metropolitan Borough Council; first Bangladeshi woman to be elected in the Midlands region, in 1999

Religion
 Abdul Qayum – Chief Imam of East London Mosque, television presenter for Peace TV Bangla and Channel S, and former lecturer at International Islamic University Malaysia.
 Aga Khan IV – 9th and current Imam and Aga Khan of Nizari Ismailism, a denomination of Isma'ilism within Shia Islam with an estimated 10–15 million adherents (10—12% of the world's Shia Muslim population).
 Daud Abdullah current Deputy Secretary General of the Muslim Council of Britain
 Maajid Nawaz former member of the Islamic political group Hizb ut-Tahrir, now the co-founder and Executive Director of Quilliam, the world's first counter-extremism think tank
 Mohammad Naseem  former GP and the chairman of the Birmingham Mosque Trust
 Musharraf Hussain – scientist, educator and religious scholar in Nottinghamshire
 Saiful Islam – Mufti and the founder, principal and director of Jamiah Khatamun Nabiyeen (JKN).
 Saleem Sidwai  accountant and Secretary General of the Muslim Council of Wales
 Vilayat Inayat Khan  eldest son of Sufi Murshid Inayat Khan, head of the Sufi Order International
 Zara Mohammed  first Woman Secretary General of the Muslim Council of Britain.

Science and medicine
 Asim Shahmalak  hair transplant surgeon and broadcaster, and proponent of such surgery; in 2009, he performed the UK's first eyelash transplant
 Haroon Ahmed  British Pakistani scientist in the fields of microelectronics and electrical engineering
 Hasnat Khan  heart and lung surgeon who was romantically involved with Diana, Princess of Wales
 Mayur Lakhani – doctor who works as a general practitioner. He was Chairman of The National Council for Palliative Care 2008–2015.
 Nadia Bukhari – pharmacist and youngest female Fellow of the Royal Pharmaceutical Society; an honour bestowed to those who have achieved excellence and distinction in their pharmacy career.
 Qanta Ahmed – physician specializing in sleep disorders. She is also an author and a newspaper columnist
 Rozina Ali  microvascular reconstructive plastic surgeon and consultant with a specialist interest in breast reconstruction; television presenter
 Sheraz Daya  ophthalmologist and eye surgeon, best known for his founding of the Centre for Sight in 1996 and use of stem-cell research during sight recovery surgery
 Tipu Zahed Aziz  Professor of neurosurgery at the John Radcliffe Hospital in Oxford; lecturer at Magdalen College, Oxford and Imperial College London medical school
 Alimuddin Zumla  Director of infectious diseases, University College Hospital, London

Sport

Boxing
 Adam Azim - professional boxer
 Adil Anwar  British light-welterweight boxer and multiple title winner
 Adnan Amar  British light-middleweight boxer, multiple title winner  
 Amer Khan  former undefeated light-heavyweight boxer, Central Area championship winner
 Amir Khan  British light-welterweight Boxer, 2004 Olympics silver medalist, and former world champion
 Hamzah Sheeraz – British light-middleweight boxer, WBO European title champion
 Haroon Khan  super-flyweight boxer and commonwealth bronze medalist 
 Jawaid Khaliq, MBE  first British Asian to win a world title belt
 Muhammad Ali – Olympic boxer
 Nadeem Siddique  former British welterweight boxer, multiple title winner
 Naseem Hamed  former WBO, WBC, IBF, and Lineal featherweight champion, and European bantamweight champion
 Qais Ashfaq  amateur boxer from Leeds and Commonwealth silver medallist
 Tanveer Ahmed  former lightweight boxer, WBO Inter-Continental champion
 Ukashir Farooq – British bantamweight boxer, former British bantamweight title winner
 Usman Ahmed  super flyweight boxer

Cricket
 Aamer Khan  Pakistani-born former English cricketer
 Aamir Farooque – former Pakistani-born English cricketer
 Adil Rashid – English cricketer who plays for Yorkshire and England Under-19s
 Ajaz Akhtar – former Pakistani people-born English cricketer
 Ajmal Shahzad – cricketer who plays for Yorkshire County Cricket Club and represents England in all three formats of the game
 Akbar Ansari  English first-class and List A cricketer who played his First-class games for Cambridge University Cricket Club and Cambridge University Centre of Cricketing Excellence, and List A cricket for Marylebone Cricket Club
 Alamgir Sheriyar – cricketer whoplays for Leicestershire
 Amjad Khan – cricketer for England International and the youngest to play for the Danish national team
 Aquib Afzaal – left-handed batsman who bowls right-arm off break
 Asim Butt – Scottish and Pakistani cricketer who was primarily a left-arm medium fast bowler
 Bilal Shafayat – cricketer
 Hamza Riazuddin – English cricketer, right-handed lower-order batsman and a right-arm medium-fast bowler who plays for Hampshire
 Imraan Mohammad  English cricketer, right-handed batsman who bowls right-arm off break 
 Imran Arif  Pakistani-born English cricketer; fast-medium bowler; plays for Worcestershire County Cricket Club
 Imran Jamshed  former Pakistani-born English cricketer; right-handed batsman who bowled right-arm medium pace
 Jahid Ahmed cricketer who played country cricket for Essex as a right-handed lower order batsman and a right-arm medium-pace bowler
 Kabir Ali  English cricketer, who formerly played for Worcestershire
 Kadeer Ali  cricketer playing for Worcestershire; related to Kabir Ali
 Kamran Afzaal  Pakistani-born English cricketer; right-handed batsman
 Majid Haq  Scottish cricket player
 Maneer Mirza  English cricketer; right-arm fast-medium bowler and right-handed batsman who played for Worcestershire
 Moeen Ali  English cricketer; right arm off break bowler and left-handed batsman currently playing for Worcestershire
 Mohammad Akhtar  Pakistani-born English cricketer; right-handed batsman who bowls right-arm off break
 Moneeb Iqbal  Scottish cricketer; right-handed batsman and leg-break bowler
 Nadeem Malik – English cricketer; right-arm fast-medium seam bowler and right-handed lower-order batsman
 Nadeem Shahid – former English first-class cricketer who played for Essex and Surrey
 Naheem Sajjad – Pakistani-born English cricketer, a right-handed batsman who bowls left-arm fast-medium
 Naqaash Tahir  English cricketer; right-arm fast-medium bowler who has played for Lancashire and Warwickshire
 Nasser Hussain former captain of England cricket team
 Omer Hussain  left-handed batsman; cousin of fellow Scottish international cricketer Majid Haq
 Owais Shah cricketer who plays for Middlesex and has appeared for England in a number of One Day Internationals and two Test matches
 Qasim Sheikh  Scottish cricketer; has represented Scotland on more than 20 occasions
 Rashid Shafayat  former English cricketer
 Rawait Khan  former English cricketer who played for Derbyshire, Derbyshire CB, and Pakistan Customs in a four-year first-class career which saw him bowl mostly in Second XI Championship matches
 Rehan Alikhan English-born former cricketer of Pakistani descent; right-handed batsman and off-break bowler
 Sajid Mahmood – Punjabi origin cricketer who plays international cricket for England and county cricket for Lancashire
 Saleem Mohammed  former English cricketer; right-handed batsman
 Shaftab Khalid  English cricketer; right-arm off-spinner who also bats right-handed
 Shammi Iqbal  English cricketer; right-handed batsman who bowls right-arm medium pace
 Usman Afzaal  cricketer who has played three Test matches for England
 Waqar Mohammad former Pakistani-born English cricketer; right-handed batsman who bowled leg break
 Wasim Khan MBE  first British-born Pakistani to play professional cricket in England; a talented left-handed batsman who also bowled right-arm medium pace
 Zafar Ansari  English cricketer who plays for Cambridge University and Surrey County Cricket Club
 Zoheb Sharif – left-handed batsman and a leg-break bowler

Football
 Abbas Farid  freestyle footballer from Newport, South Wales; named the "Freestyle King" on MTV in UK's Nike Freestyle competition
 Adam Docker  footballer, playing for Porthmadog F.C.
 Adil Nabi  footballer who plays as a forward for West Bromwich Albion
 Adnan Ahmed  footballer, playing for Tranmere Rovers
 Amjad Iqbal  footballer, playing for Farsley Celtic F.C.
 Anwar Uddin  professional footballer who plays as a defender; after joining Dagenham and Redbridge he became first British Asian to captain a side in the top four divisions; plays for Sutton United
 Atif Bashir  footballer with a British Pakistani father and a Turkish mother
 Easah Suliman – footballer currently playing for Aston Villa. Suliman has represented England at youth level; first player of Asian heritage to captain an England representative side, having done so at Under-16, Under-17 and Under-19 levels.
 Iltaf Ahmed  British Pakistani footballer who was the number one goalkeeper of Pakistan national football team
 Hamza Choudhury – British footballer of Bangladeshi and Afro-Caribbean origin
 Kashif Siddiqi  English-born Pakistani footballer
 Omar Kader – Scottish footballer who plays as a midfielder for Arbroath
 Otis Khan  footballer who plays as a midfielder for Matlock Town on loan FROM Sheffield United
 Rachid Harkouk, Footballer of Algerian origin
 Reis Ashraf  English-born Pakistani international footballer who plays for Buckingham Town in the United Counties League Division One
 Shabir Khan  English-Pakistani international footballer who plays for Worcester City, having progressed through their youth system
 Shahed Ahmed  former professional footballer who played as a striker for Wycombe Wanderers He plays for Sporting Bengal United. 
 Tahmina Begum football referee and PE assistant; in 2010, she became the first qualified female referee of Bangladeshi descent in the UK
 Usman Gondal retired British-born Pakistani international footballer; retired in 2007
 Zeeshan Rehman  football defender for Queens Park Rangers F.C.; first Pakistani and British Asian to play in the Premiership with Fulham F.C.
 Zidane Iqbal - professional footballer who plays as a midfielder for Manchester United U23

Martial arts
 Qasim Beg  undefeated kickboxing champion, two-time world champion
 Imran Khan  two-time World Muay Thai champion
 Kamal Shalorus professional UFC fighter
 Lutalo Muhammad  Taekwondo athlete
 Nisar Smiler  two-time karate world champion and 50-time gold medallist
 Ruqsana Begum  Muay Thai kickboxer; in 2010, became the current British female Atomweight (48–50 kg) Muay Thai boxing champion; in September 2012, she was nominated as captain of the British Muay Thai Team
 Ali Jacko  world champion kickboxer from east London
 Riaz Amin  Britain's youngest WEKAF (World Eskrima/Kali/Arnis Federation) world champion; practises Shotokan Karate and Filipino martial arts

Other
 Aadel Kardooni former Leicester Tigers and England A rugby player
 Abdi Jama  wheelchair basketball player, selected to play for Team GB in the 2012 Summer Paralympics in London
 Adam Khan  racing driver from Bridlington, Yorkshire; represents Pakistan in the A1 Grand Prix series; demonstration driver for the Renault F1 racing team
 Adam Gemili  sprinter of Iranian and Moroccan heritage
 Aamir Ghaffar – English badminton player
 Bulbul Hussain  wheelchair rugby player; plays mostly in a defensive role for Kent Crusaders and the Great Britain paralympic team; in 2008 and 2012, he played for Great Britain at the Paralympic Games 
 Enaam Ahmed – British F3 racing driver, series' youngest-ever champion at 17 years old
 Gaz Choudhry  wheelchair basketball player who was selected to play for Paralympics GB in the 2012 Summer Paralympics in London
 Hiddy Jahan – squash player who was ranked among the top-6 players in the world from 1970 through to 1986
 Ikram Butt  former professional rugby league footballer; first south Asian to play either code of international rugby for England, in 1995; founder of the British Asian Rugby Association and the British Pakistani rugby league team
 Imran Majid  professional British pool player
 Imran Sherwani  former English field hockey player; was capped 45 times for Great Britain and 49 times for England
 Kamran Panjavi weightlifter at the 2004 Summer Olympics
 Mo Farah  runner and twice Olympic gold medallist
 Mukhtar Mohammed  Somali-born British middle-distance athlete specialising in the 800 metres
 Shokat Ali English snooker player of Pakistani descent; represents Pakistan in international tournaments
 Hammad Miah  British snooker player
 Zubair Hoque  British single-seat racecar driver

Other
 Amal Azzudin – Scottish human rights activist
 Basil Al Bayati  architect, designer and writer; leading proponent of the school of Metaphoric Architecture
 Asif Ahmad  British diplomat, serving as the British Ambassador to the Republic of the Philippines
 Dr Humayra Abedin  National Health Service doctor of medicine who became a cause célèbre after her parents tried to force her into marriage and held her captive until freed by court order in 2008
 Hussain Bisad  one of the tallest men in the world, at   
 Robina Qureshi  Scottish human rights campaigner
 Ruhal Ahmed  former Guantanamo Bay detainee depicted in the film The Road to Guantanamo
 Saiman Miah  architecture student who designed the £5 coins for the 2012 London Summer Olympics
 Sahil Saeed  boy kidnapped in Pakistan in 2010; released unharmed after the payment of a ransom
 Shabina Begum  was involved in the leading House of Lords case UKHL 15 R (Begum) v Governors of Denbigh High School (2006) on the legal regulation of religious symbols and dress under the Human Rights Act 1998

See also
Islam in the United Kingdom
Islam in England
Islam in Northern Ireland
Islam in Scotland
Islam in Wales
Religion in the United Kingdom
List of American Muslims
List of Canadian Muslims

References

Muslims
British